Sepoy Mutiny may refer to:
Vellore mutiny (1806)
Indian Rebellion of 1857
1915 Singapore Mutiny
Barrackpore mutiny of 1824